Matthiola tricuspidata, the three-horned stock, is a widespread species of flowering plant in the family Brassicaceae, native to the shores of the Mediterranean. A halophyte, it is found in coastal stable dune grassland and coastal dune scrub, but not on shifting coastal dunes.

References

tricuspidata
Halophytes
Flora of Southwestern Europe
Flora of North Africa
Flora of Albania
Flora of Crete
Flora of Greece
Flora of Italy
Flora of Sicily
Flora of Cyprus
Flora of the East Aegean Islands
Flora of Turkey
Flora of European Turkey
Flora of Lebanon
Flora of Syria
Flora of Israel
Plants described in 1812